is a 2008 Japanese anime series based on the Battle Spirits Trading Card Game. It was produced by Sunrise and Nagoya Broadcasting Network and aired on TV Asahi from September 7, 2008 to September 6, 2009. It replaced Dinosaur King in the Nichi Asa Kids Time 7:00 timeslot and was succeeded by Battle Spirits: Shounen Gekiha Dan. It has been licensed in China, Thailand, and the Philippines.

Plot
The story follows the day-to-day adventures of an optimistic and energetic young boy nicknamed Bashin. Along with his card battler friends, he aims to be the very best at Battle Spirits. However, to accomplish that, they must defeat  throughout the world, obtain X-rare cards to build the greatest deck, and take down King Uchuuchouten.

Characters

Pyroxene Card Battlers
Chosen card battlers that each possess a  stone (alternatively translated as "cornerstone"). The stones have the power to release , an alternate dimension where spirits truly exist, and allow their respective pets to speak. In the final tournament, they refer to themselves as 

 

 X-rares： The DragonEmperor Siegfried, The TwinRowdy Diranos, The Gigantic Thor, The GiantHero Titus, The SacredEmperor Siegfrieden
The protagonist. Bashin is a 12-year-old who is very passionate about Battle Spirits, though this singularity of mind often makes him oblivious to the people around him.  He is at times rude, but often has good intentions. He lives with his mother Hayami and pet mouse Aibou, and his father left home when he was young. Initially he attends Toaru Elementary School but in episode 29 he advances to Toaru Middle School where he joins the Battle Spirits Club with Striker, Meganeko, Smile, and Seven. His catchphrase is  Bashin uses an exclusively red deck in the beginning, adding more colors as the series continues. He possesses the oval-shaped red pyroxene stone, which was given to him by his father.

 

 X-rares: The ImpregnableFortress Odin, The Gigantic Thor, The DarkDragonEmperor Siegfried, The SacredEmperor Siegfrieden

Bashin's rival. J is the "Noble Youth of the Battle Spirits World," winning championship after championship and has a large number of fans. He is also very rich, as his father is head of an electronics firm, and is chauffeured everywhere. He lives with his parents, sister Kyouka, and pet cat Okyou, but his father is often busy. He has a cold personality, though warms up with the influence of Kyouka and Bashin. He attends Tonari Private Middle School starting in episode 29, but later withdraws to enter the Thousand Spirits Group as No. 11, . In episode 42 he resigns from the Group and becomes an official member of Team Shomentoppa. J uses a primarily white deck, and possesses the oval-shaped white pyroxene stone.

 

 X-rares: The SevenShogun Desperado, The SevenShogun Destlord, The GreatArmoredLord Deathtaurus
A mysterious card battler, Suiren's true identity is that of the popular idol My Sunshine. While My Sunshine has a very bright and cheery personality, Suiren is somewhat rude and overbearing. Her pet chameleon Pink allows her to transform into Suiren, but her mask is separate. Suiren reveals her identity to the other pyroxene holders in episode 17, explaining that her image as an idol restricts her from playing a boyish game like Battle Spirits. This restriction is eventually rescinded, but as My Sunshine her deck is full of cute rather than strong cards. As she gets friendlier with the other pyroxene holders, her personalities become closer together. As Suiren she uses a primarily purple deck, while as My Sunshine she uses a yellow deck. She possesses the heart-shaped purple pyroxene stone, which she found in her homeland of Hawaii under the sea.

 

 X-rares: The Duke Kingtaurus, The SavageKnight Hercules, The GreatArmoredLord Deathtaurus
The former star player of Toaru Elementary School's soccer team, who stops playing due to a leg injury. In the hospital, Hayami teaches him how to play Battle Spirits, thus awakening him as a pyroxene card battler. Striker is typically optimistic and sensible, but becomes excited easily about soccer, Battle Spirits, or My Sunshine. He lives with his parents, younger brothers, and pet parakeet Cap. Striker uses a primarily green deck, and possesses the V-shaped green pyroxene stone.

 

 X-rares: The ArcAngelia Valiero, The PhantomLord Rean
Bashin's childhood friend, Meganeko is an initially shy, quiet glasses-wearing girl. She is a victim of Bashin's enthusiasm, as he often is too absorbed in Battle Spirits to pay attention to her. Though she loses to Bashin, she is awakened as a pyroxene card battler. After this, she begins to wear contacts instead of glasses and associates with the other pyroxene card battlers. Meganeko uses a primarily yellow deck, and possesses the butterfly-shaped yellow pyroxene stone.

 X-rares: The ImpregnableFortress Odin, The GiantHero Titus, The HugeBeastLord Behedoth
The younger twin sister of J, Kyouka is an amicable and humorous girl who cares deeply for her brother. While not a chosen battler until very late in the series, she knows about the pyroxene stones through J and Okyou and becomes a part of Bashin's circle of friends. Having been brought up in Kyoto, she has an Osakan accent. Kyouka uses a variety of colors throughout the show and is given the hexagonal blue pyroxene stone by Card Sensei in episode 44.

Pets

Bashin's pet mouse, who gains the ability to speak in episode 1. Aibou is rather feisty and tends to nag at Bashin for his shortcomings.

 

J's pet cat, who has a strong rivalry with Aibou.

Suiren's pet chameleon, who has the ability to turn invisible.

Striker's pet parakeet. Before the green pyroxene stone awakened, Cap was able to speak some phrases, but had no understanding of human words.

Kitan and Meganeko's pet dog. After Meganeko receives the yellow pyroxene stone, Nanarin begins to speak.

Card Sensei's master, who was for a time the class pet of Bashin's elementary class.

Bashin Family

Bashin's mother, usually referred to as Mama, who works as a taxi driver. She is strict with Bashin and concerned about his well-being. Hayami frequently gives her passengers advice when they appear troubled. She taught Bashin how to play Battle Spirits to cure his introversion, and later teaches Striker how to play so he can get over his depression.

Bashin's father, who left his family to explore the world. Touha called Bashin "Aibou", meaning "partner", when he was young, and in turn Bashin named his mouse Aibou when Touha left. In the past, he was part of an invincible masked card battler duo with Hayami. In the epilogue, he gives Bashin a new pyroxene stone before heading out to continue his journey around the world.

 

An artificial intelligence system that controls non-driving functions in Hayami's taxi.

Sawaragi Foundation

 X-rares: The IceBeast Mam-Morl
J and Kyouka's father. He is frequently busy working as head of a large electronics firm. Soon after developing the tag battle system with Elliot, Kiano joined the Numbers Elite as No. 3. Due to this, he quarrels with J and J also joins the Thousand Spirits group as a result. After battling and losing to Bashin in a tournament, he leaves the Numbers to become closer to his family. Kiano is Finnish in descent and in the past was part of a masked battler duo with his sister.

J and Kyouka's mother. At first she disapproves of J playing Battle Spirits, believing him to be obsessed with it and wasting his time. However, she becomes tolerant of it after J turns in her deck to her and Kyouka teaches her how to play. She is from Kyoto.

The elegant caretaker of Kiano Castle in Finland. She appears only in episode 28, though in episode 50 it is revealed that she and her brother Kiano formed a masked battler duo that was rivals with Hayami and Touha.

The Sawaragi family chauffeur who frequently drives J around the towns of Tonari and Toaru.

Toaru and Tonari Schools

  

 X-rares: The GiantHero Titus, The MobileFortress Castle Golem
A student at Toaru Middle School and the president of Toaru Middle School's BatoSupi club. Nanao is typically timid, but when in his Galaxy Seven persona, he is very confident and narcissistic. Before Bashin and the others joined, his club was populated by only himself, as all other members were frightened by him. Nanao joined the first incarnation of Team Shomen Toppa when J was Jack Knight, only to remove himself right before the tournament from a lack of confidence, and soon after reveals himself to be No. 7.

The student council president of Tonari Private Middle School. Setsuko is very strict about the school rules and tries to prevent the Battle Spirits Club from forming because it could impede studying. After reluctantly acknowledging the club's establishment, she joins the Battle Spirits club so she can rival Kyouka's academic success.

The vice president of Tonari Private Middle School's student council. He is more relaxed about the studying than Setsuko, but typically follows her lead. Due to his admiration of Kyouka, he joins the Battle Spirits Club, becoming the last member needed for it to officially form.

Toaru City
 

 X-rares: The Archangel Mikafar, The Arcangel Valiero
Bashin and Meganeko's elementary school teacher. Formerly No. 5 of the Thousand Spirits Group.

 X-rares: The Emperor Kaiseratlus, The PhantomLord Rean
Meganeko's grandfather. Formerly No. 10 of the Thousand Spirits Group.

BatoSupi TV's announcer. She appears to be enthusiastic about her job.

BatoSupi TV's commentator. With Female Announcer, he covers Battle Spirits news and events.

 

A part-time worker at the Toaru Battle Spirits Center. In episode 33 he is shown to have joined the Thousand Spirits Group.

A part-time worker at the Toaru Battle Spirits Center. She formerly lived in the same apartment complex as Bashin and frequently babysat him. She takes over working at the Battle Spirits Center when Baito-kun leaves.

My Sunshine's manager, who often is troubled by her tendency to disappear before concerts.

An actor who portrays J in the Pretty Girl Breakthrough My Sunshine movie.

Thousand Spirits Group
A mysterious organization. Its members, dubbed  by children, are said to distribute X-Rares and High Ranker Passes to those that defeat them.

Media

Anime
Battle Spirits: Shounen Toppa Bashin  aired on TV Asahi from September 7, 2008 to September 6, 2009 on the 7:00 NichiAsa timeslot. It replaced Dinosaur King in the 7:00 NichiAsa timeslot and was succeeded by Battle Spirits: Shounen Gekiha Dan. Many of the episode titles mix kanji and kana in unconventional ways to create dual meanings or tongue twisters.

Music
Opening theme
 "GO AHEAD!!"
 Lyrics: Mitsuhiro Oikawa
 Composition: TAKURO(GLAY)
 Arrangement: CHOKKAKU
 Performance: Mitsuhiro Oikawa
 Episodes: 1–50

Ending themes
  
 Lyrics: Little Non
 Composition: Little Non
 Arrangement: Masaki Suzuki
 Performance: Little Non
 Episodes: 1–26
 "dear-dear-DREAM"
 Lyrics: Aki Hata
 Composition: Katsuhiko Kurosu
 Arrangement: Nijine
 Performance: My Sunshine (Ayahi Takagaki) Meets Sphere
 Episodes: 27–50

Insert Themes
 
 Lyrics: Little Non
 Composition: Little Non
 Arrangement: Noriyoshi Matsushita, Little Non
 Performance: Little Non
 Episode: 17
 "NEVER SURRENDER"
 Lyrics: Mitsuhiro Oikawa
 Composition: Mitsuhiro Oikawa
 Arrangement: CHOKKAKU
 Performance: Mitsuhiro Oikawa
 Episodes: 33, 43, 44

Manga
A manga version by Hideaki Fujii was serialized in Kerokero Ace magazine beginning in July 2008 and ended in September 2009. The manga differs significantly from the anime.

A comic entitled  was also serialized on the official site, running for 21 chapters. It had no connection to the plot of Shounen Toppa Bashin asides from the appearance of Card Sensei.

Novel
A novel entitled  was published on July 17, 2009 by Kadokawa Tsubasa Bunko. It was written by Tatsuya Hamazaki and illustrated by Hideaki Fujii. A new student named  has appeared in Bashin's class, but only Meganeko notices. Since then, a series of mysteries have occurred within the school which Bashin and Meganeko must solve.

Video games
While no games have been made featuring solely the cast of Shounen Toppa Bashin, two games including Shounen Toppa Bashin, Shounen Gekiha Dan, and game-original characters have been made. The first,  was released November 12, 2009 for the Sony PSP by Namco Bandai Games. Card battles are shown in real time on a 3D field where the characters and spirits are rendered. On August 5, 2010, Namco Bandai Games also released  for the Nintendo DS. The player character, travels around Chikaba Town challenging other card battlers. Unlike the previous games, Battle Spirits is played as it is in real life. Characters from both Shounen Toppa Bashin and Shounen Gekiha Dan must be unlocked in order to battle them.

References

External links
 Official Battle Spirits Trading Card Game site 
 Sunrise's Battle Spirits: Shounen Toppa Bashin site 
 Nagoya Broadcasting Network's Battle Spirits: Shounen Toppa Bashin site 
 

Adventure anime and manga
2008 anime television series debuts
2008 manga
Bandai Namco franchises
Manga series
Shōnen manga
Sunrise (company)
TV Asahi original programming